The Communauté Juive Libérale de Genève - GIL or Liberal Jewish Community of Geneva is a Liberal Jewish community located on the eastern side of the river Rhone in Geneva. Established as the Liberal Israelite Group (Groupe Israélite Libéral) on 7 December 1970, the organisation was later renamed the Communauté Juive Libérale de Genève. Guided by its Rabbi François Garaï since 1969, a year before its formal inception, the community held services in a variety of settings: a private library, a rented room on rue Moillebeau, and then at quai du Seujet. Finally, GIL relocated its activities to a purpose built facility, Beith GIL, on Route de Chêne which hosts a Synagogue as well as spaces for community activities.
A member of international Jewish organisations such as the World Union for Progressive Judaism and the Federation for francophone progressive Judaism (Fédération du judaïsme libéral francophone), GIL is an influential organisation in Reform Judaism both within Switzerland, but also within the global context of Reform Judaism.

References

Synagogues in Switzerland
Reform synagogues
Jewish organizations established in 1970
Reform Judaism in Switzerland